Somaek is a beer cocktail made with soju and beer. The beer used is typically a lager-style.

Etymology 
It is a syllabic abbreviation of two Korean words, soju and maekju ("beer").

Preparation 
The ratio varies liberally. There is no consensus, but it is widely suggested that the ideal ratio is three parts soju to seven parts beer.

See also 
 Boilermaker
Queen Mary (cocktail)
 U-Boot
 Yorsh

References 

Beer in South Korea
Cocktails with beer
Soju
South Korean alcoholic drinks